Wellington Harbour Board Head Office and Bond Store is a historic building on Jervois Quay in Wellington, New Zealand. The building currently houses the Wellington Museum.

It was commissioned in 1890 by the Wellington Harbour Board to replace wooden buildings from the 1860s, designed by Frederick de Jersey Clere in the French Second Empire style, and completed in 1892.

The building was owned by the Wellington Harbour Board, but in 1989 with the reorganisation of local bodies throughout New Zealand, the commercial functions of the WHB were transferred to Centreport a  Regional Council-owned company. Some property owned by the WHB was transferred to the Wellington City Council.

The building, now known as the Bond Store, is classified as a "Category 1" ("places of 'special or outstanding historical or cultural heritage significance or value'") historic place by Heritage New Zealand.

References

Buildings and structures in Wellington City
Heritage New Zealand Category 1 historic places in the Wellington Region
Frederick de Jersey Clere buildings
1890s architecture in New Zealand